Hans Christiansen (6 March 1866 in Flensburg – 5 January 1945 in Wiesbaden) was a German craftsman and painter of the Jugendstil. He was one of the founders of the Darmstadt Artists' Colony.

References

External links

1866 births
1945 deaths
German artists
Art Nouveau artists